The Rivière Rouge is a tributary of the rivière au Saumon. This river flows in the municipalities of Milan (MRC Le Granit Regional County Municipality) and Lingwick (MRC) Le Haut-Saint-François Regional County Municipality), in the administrative region of Estrie, in the province of Quebec, in Canada.

Forestry is the main economic activity in this valley; agriculture, second.

The surface of the Salmon River is usually frozen from mid-December to mid-March, except the rapids areas; however, safe circulation on the ice is generally from late December to early March.

Geography 

  south-west, down the mountain, to a stream (coming from the south-east);
  towards the west especially in the forest zone (sometimes agricultural), by forming a curve towards the south, crossing two series of rapids, until the  route 108;
  to the northwest, entering a large area of marsh where the river winds more and more, collecting the Ferré stream (coming from the northeast), collecting another stream (from the south) to the outlet (from the north) of Lac Brochet;

The red river flows on the northeast bank of the rivière au Saumon.

Toponymy 
Formerly, this river was designated "Albion River".

The toponym "Rivière Rouge" was formalized on December 18, 1979, at the Commission de toponymie du Québec.

See also 
 List of rivers of Quebec

Notes and references 

Rivers of Estrie
Le Haut-Saint-François Regional County Municipality
Le Granit Regional County Municipality